The Department of Municipal Affairs was a part of the Government of New Brunswick.  It was charged with the planning and supervision of local government in New Brunswick. From 1938 to 1954, this ministry was combined with Education. In 1986, the department became the Department of Municipal Affairs and Environment; the department was renamed back to the original name in 1989. In 1991, the department's functions were assumed by the new Department of Municipalities, Culture and Housing.

Ministers

References 
 List of ministers and deputy ministers by department, New Brunswick Legislative Library  (pdf)

Defunct New Brunswick government departments and agencies